The 2008 Minnesota U.S. House of Representatives elections took place on November 4, 2008. All 8 congressional seats that make up the state's delegation were contested. Representatives were elected for two-year terms; those elected served in the 111th United States Congress from January 4, 2009 until January 3, 2011.

The 2008 Presidential election, 2008 Senate election (for the seat held by Republican Norm Coleman), and 2008 Minnesota Legislature elections occurred on the same date, as well as many local elections and ballot initiatives.

The 110th congressional delegation from the U.S. state of Minnesota had 3 Republicans and 5 Democratic-Farmer-Labor Party members (DFLers). Six were men; two were women.  Three were freshmen in the 110th congress.  The veterans ranged in experience from Jim Oberstar with 33 years of experience and the chairman of the Transportation Committee to John Kline with just four years of experience.

Overview

District 1

This district extended across southern Minnesota from the border with South Dakota to the border of Wisconsin. DFLer Tim Walz defeated 6-term Republican Gil Gutknecht in 2006 in somewhat of a surprise victory.  Walz had no opponent in the race for the DFL nomination for the seat in the September 12, 2006 primary election. He beat incumbent Republican Gil Gutknecht in the general election by a margin of 53% to 47%. Walz is a former teacher and Command Sergeant Major in the National Guard. The district is rated as an R+1 on the CPVI scale. Incumbent Tim Walz was opposed by Brian Davis, a Mayo Clinic physician, who was endorsed by the CD1 Republican Party and Independence Party of Minnesota candidate, Greg Mikkelson. CQ Politics forecast the race as 'Leans Democratic'. Walz won the 2008 race, garnering 62.5% of the vote.

Democratic primary

Candidates
 Tim Walz, incumbent U.S. Representative since 2007

Results

Independence Party primary

Candidates
 Gregory Mikkelson

Results

Republican primary

Candidates
 Brian J. Davis, Mayo Clinic physician
 Dick Day, State Senator since 1991, former Minnesota Senate Majority Leader (1997-2007)

Results

General election

Results

District 2

This district spans the width of the entire southern metro area and contains all of Carver, Scott, Le Sueur, Goodhue and Rice Counties and most of Dakota County. Republican John Kline held on to the second district seat in 2006, defeating DFL challenger, former FBI agent, Coleen Rowley. The district leans Republican with a CPVI of R+3, and Kline's unwavering support for Bush and the Iraq War did not make him too vulnerable to a challenger in 2008. On October 4, 2007, Iraq War veteran Steve Sarvi announced he would challenge Kline for the seat. His experience also includes being mayor of Watertown, Minnesota and city administrator for Victoria, Minnesota. He believed that a change in U.S. policy in Iraq was needed. On May 3, Sarvi was endorsed by the 2nd District DFL party. Sarvi was also endorsed by the Independence Party of Minnesota. CQ Politics forecast the race as 'Republican Favored'. Kline won the 2008 race, garnering 57.3% of the vote.

General election

Results

District 3

This district encompasses the suburbs of Hennepin County to the north, west, and south of Minneapolis. Republican 9-term incumbent Jim Ramstad announced on September 17, 2007 that he would not seek reelection in 2008. Erik Paulsen, a Republican who was the majority leader in the Minnesota House of Representatives when the Republicans held a majority was opposed by DFLer, Ashwin Madia who is an Iraq War veteran. David Dillon of the Independence Party of Minnesota (campaign website) and Harley Swarm of the Constitution Party (campaign website) also competed. The district is rated as an R+1 on the CPVI scale, indicating a district that could swing toward either party. CQ Politics forecast the race as 'No Clear Favorite'. Paulsen won the 2008 race, garnering 48.5% of the vote.

Democratic primary

Candidates
 Ashwin Madia, Iraq War veteran

Results

Independence Party primary

Candidates
 David Dillon
 Steev Ramsdell

Results

Republican primary

Candidates
 Erik Paulsen, State Representative from district 42B since 1995, and former Minnesota House Majority Leader (2003-2007)

Results

General election

Results

District 4

This district covers most of Ramsey County including all of Saint Paul and several Saint Paul suburbs. It is held by the solidly progressive 4-term DFLer, Betty McCollum. The district is rated a secure D+13 on the CPVI scale, posing a formidable barrier to any potential Republican challengers. Ed Matthews, an attorney, was the Republican candidate. CQ Politics forecast the race as 'Safe Democratic'. McCollum won the 2008 race, garnering 68.4% of the vote.

General election

Results

District 5

This district covers eastern Hennepin County, including the entire city of Minneapolis, Minnesota, along with parts of Anoka and Ramsey counties. With the 2007 retirement of Martin Sabo, the opportunity presented itself for Keith Ellison to compete for Sabo's seat against several aspirants. He is the first African American U.S. Representative from Minnesota and the first Muslim member of the U.S. Congress.  Like McCollum, Ellison is also a solidly progressive legislator, which is in keeping with the district, rating D+21 on the CPVI scale. He was challenged by Republican Barb Davis White, a minister, author, and civil rights activist. The Independence Party of Minnesota candidate was Bill McGaughey. CQ Politics forecast the race as 'Safe Democratic'.

Democratic primary

Candidates
 Keith Ellison, incumbent U.S. Representative since 2007
 Gregg A. Iverson

Results

Independence Party primary

Candidates
 Bill McGaughey

Results

Republican primary

Candidates
 Barb Davis White, minister, author, and civil rights activist

Results

General election

Results

District 6

This district includes most or all of Benton, Sherburne, Stearns, Wright, Anoka, and Washington counties. First-term Republican Michele Bachmann won a hard-fought battle against Patty Wetterling in 2006, with the help of Karl Rove and Dick Cheney campaigning on her behalf and a multimillion-dollar warchest. With a CPVI of R+5, the district posed an uphill battle for the DFL challenger, former state transportation commissioner Elwyn Tinklenberg (DFL). On April 26, 2008, the 6th District DFL endorsed Tinklenberg for this race, as did the Independence Party of Minnesota although Bob Anderson was running as an INDC candidate.

Bachmann's charges about "anti-American views" shifted the political dynamics of this campaign, giving a lift to Tinklenberg's candidacy and attracting $1.3 million in new contributions, plus $1 million from the DNC. At the same time the RNC withdrew media buys on behalf of Bachmann. CQ Politics changed its forecast from 'Republican Favored' to 'Leans Republican' on October 20, and then to 'No Clear Favorite' on October 28. The Cook Political Report then rated it as 'Republican Toss Up'. Despite the controversy, Bachmann won the 2008 race, garnering 46.4% of the vote to Tinklenberg's 43.4% and Anderson's 10%.

Democratic primary

Candidates
 El Tinklenberg, former Minnesota Commissioner of Transportation (1999-2002)

Results

Independence Party primary

Candidates
 Bob Anderson

Results

Republican primary

Candidates
 Michele Bachmann, incumbent U.S. Representative since 2007
 Aubrey Immelman

Results

General election

Polling

Results

District 7

This district covers almost all of the western side of Minnesota from the Canada–US border down to Lincoln County and is the largest district in the state.  As chairman of the House Agriculture Committee, 9-term DFLer Collin Peterson is at home in his mostly-agricultural district. Although the district leaned Republican with a CPVI of R+6, Peterson's social conservatism and farmer/labor DFL values served him well in his district. He won with 70% of the vote in 2006. Republican Glen Menze challenged Peterson. CQ Politics forecast the race as 'Safe Democratic'.

Democratic primary

Candidates
 Collin C. Peterson, incumbent U.S. Representative since 1991

Results

Republican primary

Candidates
 Glen Menze
 Alan Roebke

Results

General election

Results

District 8

This district covers the northeastern part of Minnesota and includes Duluth, Hibbing, and the Mesabi Range. Seventeen-term veteran DFLer, Jim Oberstar was Minnesota's senior representative. In 2006, former Republican U.S. Senator Rod Grams challenged Oberstar, garnering 34% of the vote. In 2008, 74-year-old Oberstar maintained his popularity among his constituency. The district leaned Democratic with a CPVI of D+4 owing to the loyalty of miners, loggers, and farmers to the DFL. Republican, Michael Cummins ran against Oberstar. On May 3, 2008, the 8th District DFL endorsed Oberstar for another term.  CQ Politics forecast the race as 'Safe Democratic'.

General election

Results

See also
 United States House of Representatives elections, 2008
 United States presidential election in Minnesota, 2008
 United States Senate election in Minnesota, 2008
 Minnesota House of Representatives election, 2008

References

External links
Election Center from the Minnesota Secretary of State

Minnesota U.S. House Races from 2008 Race Tracker
Campaign contributions for Minnesota congressional races from OpenSecrets

2008
Minnesota
United States House of Representatives